Karl Gustaf Veijola (11 November 1864, Ii, Finland – 4 September 1936) was a Finnish farmer and politician. He was a Member of the Parliament of Finland from 1908 to 1909, representing the Agrarian League.

References

1864 births
1936 deaths
People from Ii
People from Oulu Province (Grand Duchy of Finland)
Centre Party (Finland) politicians
Members of the Parliament of Finland (1908–09)